Shaukat Qadir is an independent Risk and Security Analyst who works generally in South Asia, particularly in Pakistan and Afghanistan. He started his career as a pilot in the Pakistan Air Force (PAF) and then moved to the Pakistan Army. He retired in 1998 as a Brigadier. In 1999, he became the founder and vice-president, and later president, of the semi-independent think tank Islamabad Policy Research Institute (IPRI). In 2001, he sought early retirement due to disagreements with the military government. Since then, he has been visiting faculty at the Fatima Jinnah Women University, writing in various national and international newspapers and journals, and working as an independent Security and Risk Assessment consultant. He is also currently a Senior Analyst at Wikistrat.

Background
Shaukat began his military career as a Flight Cadet in the PAF in 1965. He joined the Pakistan Military Academy in 1968. In 1970, he was commissioned in the 6th Battalion, Frontier Force Regiment, 6 FF (Infantry).

He returned from his six-month sojourn in East Pakistan (now called Bangladesh) weeks before the surrender at the end of the 1971 war. He saw action during the Balochistan insurgency in the 1970s. Over the years, he has commanded three brigades and served on the staff of a brigade, a division, and a corps; he has also been on the faculty of the infantry school, Command and Staff College, and the War Wing at the National Defence University, Islamabad. In 1998, he sought and obtained early retirement from the Army.

In 1999, he founded the Islamabad Policy Research Institute (IPRI) and became the vice-president. He finally requested retirement again from the IPRI in 2001. Since then, he has been a free-lance journalist, an author with a weekly column, a member of visiting faculty at the Fatima Jinnah Women's University, and an invited speaker and author at various national and international conferences.

Author and columnist
Shaukat has written in various newspapers, magazines, journals and books over the last decade, both nationally and internationally. He has a weekly column in the Daily Times (Pakistan) and also writes regularly for The National. In the past, he has written for the Far Eastern Economic Review, RUSI – Royal United Services Institute (UK), PILDAT – Pakistan Institute for Legislative Development and Transparency, Rediff.com (India), Dawn (Pakistan), and The Round Table Journal, among others.

Articles and political views

Pakistan Army 
Shaukat has been vocal about his criticism (and, to some extent, his praise) about the government of Pakistan, and also of other countries. His analysis of the Kargil War (carried by RUSI ) is highly cited and generally viewed as an objective analysis by both sides of the divide.

In general, he is a politic and a democrat, who believes that the military should remain subordinate to the elected leaders, and should have no political role. He stated as much in 1990 to the then Army Chief, while he was a student at the National Defence College (now University), and also after retirement, in various forums.

"Apart from the fact that such avoidance of responsibility by the political leadership is tantamount to a tacit acceptance of a continued political role of the military, no military can, or should, possibly be expected to cater for all political considerations."

"Ours is a country with a history of military coups and, even when the army was not running the country, its political power was an ominous presence. Ayub Khan started well, till he led us into an unnecessary war in 1965, which we were fortunate to end in a stalemate. Yahya Khan didn't initiate a war but he created conditions for India to dismember us. Zia-ul Haq gave birth to religious extremism and the drug/Kalashnikov culture. Pervez Musharraf went farther than all the rest: he permitted terrorists to flower, in instances like Lal Masjid, even nurtured them until there was no option left but to use force which caused the death of hundreds of children. Democratic army chiefs have been a rarity."

Abstract philosophy
His more abstract political and philosophical views are scattered in various articles, and seem inspired from Jean Jacque Rousseau's 'A Social Contract', which he often quotes in his articles. He believes that while sovereignty lies with the people, it is transferred to their elected representatives by the people themselves. Consequently, elected representatives are bound by the democratic system to deliver 'good governance,' in the widest sense of the term.

"There is one inalienable right of the citizens of society i.e. liberty (in all its forms) and therefore, the state exists for but one purpose alone i.e. to ensure the individual and collective rights of its citizens. To this end, the state is the only organisation authorised the use of force; but that too solely in attempting to achieve this end that it exists for."

References

External links
 Shaukat Qadir Home Page
 Shaukat Qadir's biography on Wikistrat

Living people
Pakistan Air Force personnel
Frontier Force Regiment officers
Pakistani political commentators
Year of birth missing (living people)